Micrantheum ericoides is an inconspicuous shrub growing on poor sandy soils in eastern Australia. Often seen in areas of mid to relatively high rainfall. Usually seen between 20 and 80 cm high. Flowers are tiny, white or pink occurring between August and November. However, the plant may be noticed by the red fruit capsules.

The specific epithet ericoides refers to a similarity to the European heath, or Erica. This plant first appeared in scientific literature in 1818, published by the French botanist René Louiche Desfontaines.

References

Picrodendraceae
Malpighiales of Australia
Flora of Queensland
Flora of New South Wales
Taxa named by René Louiche Desfontaines